El Muerto es un vivo is a 1953 Argentine film directed by Yago Blass.

Cast
 Harry Mimmo
 Diana de Córdoba
 Ramón Garay
 María Esther Podestá
 Carlos Lagrotta
 Marisa Núñez
 Ángel Walk

References

External links
 

1953 films
1950s Spanish-language films
Argentine black-and-white films
Argentine comedy films
1953 comedy films
1950s Argentine films